Haas Formula LLC, competing as MoneyGram Haas F1 Team, is an American-licensed Formula One racing team established by NASCAR Cup Series team co-owner Gene Haas in April 2014. The team originally intended to make its debut at the start of the  season but later elected to postpone their entry until the  season. The team principal is Guenther Steiner.

The team is headquartered in Kannapolis, North Carolina, United States –  from Charlotte – alongside sister team and NASCAR entrant Stewart-Haas Racing, though the two teams are separate entities. The team also established a forward base in Banbury, England, to turn cars around between races during the European part of the calendar.

History

Preparations
The Haas Lola team was owned by former McLaren boss Teddy Mayer and Carl Haas, who was not related to Gene Haas.

Following the collapse of Marussia F1 during the  season and the auctioning of their assets, Haas purchased the team's Banbury headquarters to serve as a forward base for their operations.

Unrestricted by testing regulations until the time the team actually entered Formula One, Haas shook its new car down in December 2015 ahead of official pre-season testing at Barcelona in early 2016. Haas approached Italian manufacturer Dallara to build their chassis, with a power unit supplied by Ferrari. Former Jaguar and Red Bull Racing technical director Guenther Steiner is the team principal. Haas confirmed its new car had passed the mandatory FIA crash tests in January 2016.

Relationship with Ferrari 
Haas's approach of establishing a far-reaching partnership with Ferrari was met with a mixed response from the paddock. The constructor was applauded for pioneering a low-cost model that would allow new teams to enter the sport and be competitive, which had been of concern to the sport for some years. Conversely, Haas's approach was criticized by smaller, privateer teams who had invested in their own infrastructure and expressed concerns about the close relationship between manufacturers and satellite constructors handing more political power to the sport's larger constructors.

In 2018 Haas again came under fire from competitors after arriving at winter testing with a car that strongly resembled the Ferrari SF70H, Ferrari's 2017 car. Competitors McLaren and Force India both criticized the partnership between Ferrari and Haas. While no official grievance has been filled with the FIA, McLaren boss Zak Brown has questioned the relationship.

During  rule discussions in April 2019, concerns over Haas F1's B-team approach were presented by Renault and McLaren. F1 Director of Motorsports Ross Brawn said that he wants to protect and enhance the model for the foreseeable future as it allows teams with smaller budgets to enter the sport.

Haas have depended upon Ferrari for their reserve drivers in the past. In particular they did two FP1 sessions for Ferrari reserve Antonio Giovinazzi. Additionally during his tenure at the team, Mick Schumacher was still a Ferrari Academy Driver and Ferrari Reserve driver.

2016 season

Romain Grosjean and Esteban Gutiérrez drove for the team in 2016. In the team's debut at the opening , Grosjean finished 6th, scoring eight points for the team, which became the first American constructor to win points in its first F1 race and the first constructor overall since Toyota Racing in 2002 to record points in its debut. At the same race, Gutiérrez crashed out in an incident which destroyed former world champion Fernando Alonso's McLaren and caused the race to be temporarily red-flagged. Another impressive race followed in Bahrain, where Grosjean finished 5th. However, for the rest of the season, the team fell off the pace, only scoring points on three more occasions. Grosjean picked up all 29 points en route to 8th in the Constructors' Championship.

2017 season

Kevin Magnussen drove alongside Grosjean in 2017, replacing Gutiérrez. In the first race of the season, the team scored its best-ever qualifying effort with Grosjean piloting the VF-17 to 6th place. However, in the race, both cars were forced to retire with mechanical failures. The second race weekend proved better for the team with Magnussen finishing 8th, scoring his first points since his 10th-place finish in the 2016 Singapore Grand Prix, and Haas's first points since the 2016 United States Grand Prix, where Grosjean finished 10th.

The team's success would continue in 2017 as Haas would also go on to get their first double points finish in Monaco, where Grosjean and Magnussen finished 8th and 10th, respectively. The team finished 8th in the constructors' title for the second consecutive year after being surpassed by the Renault Sport Formula One Team in the final races.

2018 season

In February 2018, Haas unveiled their new car, the VF-18, although some competitors called for an investigation due to its resemblance to the previous year's Ferrari, the SF70H. Following a strong showing during winter testing, Haas again had a competitive weekend in Australia, scoring the team's best-ever starting grid positions with Magnussen starting 5th and Grosjean 6th, respectively. During the race, they were running in 4th, and 5th positions which would have given them their best result and half of their 2017 points tally, but both cars retired one lap after their respective pit stops. They would eventually match this 4th and 5th-place result in Austria, surpassing their 2017 points total after only nine races. At the Singapore Grand Prix, Magnussen scored Haas' first-ever fastest lap. 2018 was their best season to date, finishing fifth in the Constructors' Championship, one point short of doubling their previous year's performance.

2019 season

The team took on Rich Energy as a title sponsor for 2019. This was part of the activation of a multi-year title sponsorship deal with Rich Energy, a British energy drink company that was previously linked to purchasing Force India. The team also retained their 2018 driver line up for 2019 consisting of Grosjean and Magnussen for the third consecutive year. Haas' challenger for the 2019 season was the VF-19.

The VF-19 often showed impressive pace during qualifying but struggled during the race. At the opening race in Australia, Magnussen finished 6th in what would eventually be the team's best season result. The team's qualifying pace was evident in Austria, where Magnussen recorded the 5th-fastest time but finished the race in 19th with Grosjean 16th. Four days before the British Grand Prix, in July, the Rich Energy Twitter account announced that the sponsorship deal had been terminated, citing poor performance. This was later denied by both the team and Rich Energy's shareholders, and it was asserted that the tweet was the result of a "rogue" individual. For the British Grand Prix the team elected to reverse the upgrades placed on Grosjean's car, using the same specification run in Australia, to determine the causes of the car's poor race pace. However, both drivers collided with each other on the first lap, causing a double retirement for the team. The German Grand Prix provided the team's best-combined result of the season, being classified 7th and 8th after post-race penalties for other drivers.

Title sponsor Rich Energy faced numerous legal issues during the year, including being found to have plagiarized the logo of bicycle manufacturer Whyte Bikes. In September, a day after the Italian Grand Prix, Rich Energy announced the termination of the deal with Haas with immediate effect. The team had earned no points for the race at Monza, with Grosjean finishing only 16th and Magnussen retiring.

Haas finished the season in 9th place in the constructors' championship with 28 points, the team's worst finish since their founding in 2016.

2020 season

Haas kept an unchanged lineup of Grosjean and Magnussen for the 2020 season.

In the 2020 Formula One World Championship, Haas scored 3 points, with Magnussen finishing 9th in Hungary but receiving a time penalty that would drop him to 10th, and Grosjean finishing 9th in the Eifel Grand Prix. They would not score again. The team finished 9th in the Constructor's Championship, scoring the fewest points in team history.

On the opening lap of the Bahrain Grand Prix, Grosjean collided with AlphaTauri driver Daniil Kvyat and crashed through the barriers between turns 3 and 4. The impact resulted in the car splitting in two and bursting into flames. Grosjean escaped significant injury, suffering burns on his hands, and was hospitalized after the race. He remarked that the halo head protection device likely saved his life. The crash ruled him out of the following week's Sakhir Grand Prix, and he was replaced by Haas reserve driver Pietro Fittipaldi.

2021 season

Grosjean left Haas at the end of the 2020 Championship. Magnussen stayed with the team as a test and reserve driver in the 2021 Championship. They were replaced by Russian Nikita Mazepin, and 2020 Formula 2 Championship winner Mick Schumacher, son of seven-time Formula One world champion Michael Schumacher. To survive financially, the team opted to halt the development of the 2021 car, instead focusing resources on the 2022 car. They also secured Uralkali, a Russian potash fertilizer producer, of which Mazepin's father Dmitry is a key shareholder, as the title sponsor for the team. Uralkali's sponsorship resulted in a livery containing the colors of the Russian flag. Steiner denied this was to circumvent a World Anti-Doping Agency ban on the use of the Russian flag. During the first race, Mazepin spun out on the first lap, while Schumacher finished 16th in his debut, the last of all running cars. In the season's final race, Mazepin tested positive for coronavirus and was ruled out of the race. Haas would only field one driver, rather than replace Mazepin with reserve driver Kevin Magnussen, as he had not fulfilled the requirement of having competed in a practice session for the team.

2022 season

Following the Russian invasion of Ukraine, Haas removed the branding of Russian sponsor Uralkali from its cars and the colors of the Russian flag. On 5 March, the team announced it had terminated its title sponsorship deal with Uralkali and its driver contract with Mazepin. Kevin Magnussen, who previously drove for the team from 2017 to 2020, was announced as his replacement.

Haas's decision to focus on building the VF-22 throughout the 2021 season resulted in the car proving to be competitive among the mid-field teams. With Magnussen returning, Haas scored in the two opening race of the season in Bahrain and Saudi Arabia with Magnussen; Schumacher failed to score points in Bahrain and did not start in Saudi Arabia due to a crash in qualifying. In the following races, Magnussen and Schumacher struggled to score points or finish the race as both drivers were sometimes in contact with other drivers despite their high starting position after qualifying 

After a points drought, Haas took double points finish in 2022 British Grand Prix with Magnussen finishing 10th and Schumacher 8th; his first-ever point finish as a Formula One driver and first double-point finish for Haas after three years. The momentum is followed by Magnussen finishing 8th and Schumacher finishing 6th in the following race in 2022 Austrian Grand Prix.

The team took their maiden pole position at the São Paulo Grand Prix, with Magnussen out-qualifying the field in changing conditions to start on pole for the sprint race. Magnussen retired after a collision with McLaren's Daniel Ricciardo at the start of the race. 

Schumacher departed from Haas at the end of the season.

2023 season 

Haas signed a title sponsorship deal with MoneyGram for the 2023 season onwards.

MoneyGram Haas F1 Team announced a new partnership with Chipotle Mexican Grill (NYSE:CMG), ahead of the 2023 FIA Formula 1 World Championship. The Chipotle Mexican Grill logo will feature on both the nose and side of the VF-23, racesuits of MoneyGram Haas F1 Team drivers Kevin Magnussen and Nico Hulkenberg and team apparel.

Nico Hulkenberg's Formula One return was announced prior to the 2022 Abu Dhabi Grand Prix and will partner Magnussen for the 2023 season. Early 2023, Haas announced that Pietro Fittipaldi would remain as the official test and reserve driver for 2023. The two-time grand prix starter will work with the only American team competing in the FIA Formula 1 World Championship for a fifth consecutive season, providing support to the squad and helping develop the VF-23. Fittipaldi has previously tested the VF-18 and VF-19 before jumping into the cockpit to race at the final two rounds of the 2020 FIA Formula 1 World Championship, substituting in the VF-20 for an injured Romain Grosjean.

Complete Formula One results
(key)

Notes
 * – Season still in progress.
 † – The driver did not finish the Grand Prix but was classified, as he completed over 90% of the race distance.

Driver development program 
Since the team's foundation, multiple drivers have been affiliated with Haas. These include:

Notes

References

External links

 

2014 establishments in North Carolina
American auto racing teams
Companies based in North Carolina
American companies established in 2014
Formula One entrants
Auto racing teams established in 2014